GCIS may refer to:

 Georgia Career Information System
 Global Change Information System
 Government Communication and Information System
 Global City International School, Bangalore

See also 
 GCI (disambiguation)